Morgan Township Middle-High School is a public high school located in Valparaiso, Indiana.

See also
 List of high schools in Indiana

References

External links
 Official Website

Buildings and structures in Porter County, Indiana
Public middle schools in Indiana
Public high schools in Indiana